The Kung Fu Scholar is a 1993 Hong Kong martial arts comedy film directed by Norman Law and starring Aaron Kwok, Vivian Chow and Dicky Cheung.

Plot
Lun Man-chui (Dicky Cheung) and Lau Sin-hoi (Aaron Kwok) are students at Ming College who always disputed with each other. Lun is a poor but smart scholar who liked to do petty tricks on others. Lau is a straightforward and smart man who is martial artist since he was a kid. They both fall for their beautiful classmate Ching-ching (Vivian Chow), who is Headmaster Heung's (Ng Man-tat) niece. Later, a competition arises between Ming College and its rival, Oriental College. To win in the competition, Headmaster Heung hires martial arts expert Lee Tai-chun (Bryan Leung) to teach the students. Lee is being pursued by Imperial Secret Agents and took the job to cover up his real identity. On the day of the competition, Lee was found by the Imperial Secret Agents, however, with the help of Lun and Lau, Lee manages to escape and they make their way back to the competition and triumphed. From then on, Lun and Lau become best friends.

Cast
Dicky Cheung as Lun Man-chui
Aaron Kwok as Lau Sin-hoi 
Vivian Chow as Ching-ching
Ng Man-tat as Headmaster Heung
Bryan Leung as Lee Tai-chun / Lee Man-lung
Gordon Liu as His Excellency
Kent Cheng as Fat Cat
Kingdom Yuen as Lun Man-chui's mother
Johnny Tang as Tang Lin-yu
Anderson Junior as Oriental College's spectacled bully
Michael Chow as Oriental College's bully
Wong San as Mr. Chin
Sam Wong as Eunuch Ngai
Hoi Sang Lee as Copper Head
Chan Tik-hak as Casino manager
Teresa Ha as Granny beggar
Wong Yat-fei as Oriental College's servant
Wong Wai-wu as Waiter Shui
Bobby Yip as Lau Sin-hoi's servant beating Fat Cat
Joey Leung as Lau Sin-hoi's friend
Gabriel Wong as Oriental College's quiz contestant
Lo Hung as College quiz moderator
Peter Lai as Lu Restaurant's boss
Pak Yan as Tang Lin-yu's mother
Baby Bo as Ching-ching's cousin
Ho Pak-kwong as Cantonese Association representative
Ling Hon as Oriental College headmaster
Wong Hung as tea house waiter
Cheng Ka-sang as lecherous customer
Tony Tam as one of Eunuch's men
Wong Ka-leung as one of Eunuch's men

Box office
The film grossed HK$8,384,786 at the Hong Kong box office during its theatrical run from 13 to 16 January in Hong Kong.

External links

Kung Fu Scholar at Hong Kong Cinemagic

The Kung Fu Scholar film review at LoveHKFilm.com

1994 films
1994 action comedy films
1990s adventure comedy films
1990s martial arts comedy films
Hong Kong action comedy films
Hong Kong adventure comedy films
Hong Kong martial arts comedy films
Kung fu films
1990s Cantonese-language films
Films set in the Ming dynasty
1990s Hong Kong films